Singac (pronounced SING-ack) is an unincorporated community and census-designated place (CDP) located within Little Falls Township, in Passaic County, New Jersey, United States. As of the 2010 United States Census, the CDP's population was 3,618.

Geography
According to the United States Census Bureau, the CDP had a total area of 0.498 square miles (1.289 km2), including 0.466 square miles (1.207 km2) of land and 0.032 square miles (0.082 km2) of water (6.34%).

Singac is a neighborhood in the western end of Little Falls Township.  It is bounded to the north by the Passaic River.  New Jersey Route 23, known as the Newark-Pompton Turnpike or Pompton Avenue, runs north-south through the community.

Demographics

References

Census-designated places in Passaic County, New Jersey
Little Falls, New Jersey